Uyarani is a  volcano in the Cordillera Occidental in the Andes of Bolivia. It is situated in the Oruro Department, Sajama Province, Turco Municipality, Turco Canton. It lies south-east of the extinct Sajama volcano and the Chullkani volcano and south-west of the Asu Asuni volcanic complex, between the Challwiri River and the Lauca River.

See also
 Jitiri
 Laram Q'awa
 Kunturiri

References 

Volcanoes of Oruro Department